The 2005 Cork Intermediate Football Championship was the 70th staging of the Cork Intermediate Football Championship since its establishment by the Cork County Board. The draw for the opening fixtures took place on 12 December 2004. The championship ran from 8 April to 23 October 2005.

The final was played on 23 October 2005 at Páirc Uí Chaoimh in Cork, between Carbery Rangers and Glanmire, in what was their first ever meeting in the final. Carbery Rangers won the match by 1–13 to 2–05 to claim their first ever championship title.

Results

First round

Second round

 Cill na Martra received a bye in this round.

Third round

 Killavullen and Mayfield received byes on this round.

Quarter-finals

Semi-finals

Final

Championship statistics

Top scorers

In a single game

References

2005 in Irish sport
Cork Intermediate Football Championship